Mikkel Mac Jensen (born 18 December 1992 in Nykøbing Falster) is a Danish racing driver.

Career 
Like many other racing drivers Mac began his racing career in karting. He remained in karting until 2008. In 2009 he began his formula racing career. He started 8 of 16 races in Danish Formula Ford, achieving six podium finishes and two victories. He concluded the season in the seventh position. He also participated in five rounds of Formula BMW Europe, finishing 23rd in the championship. In 2010 Mac moved to the Formula Renault 2.0 Northern European Cup, driving for KTR. He won three races and finished runner-up behind Ludwig Ghidi with 340 points.

International GT Open 
Mikkel will be joining the Ferrari supported team Spirit of Race / AF Corse for the 2017 GT Open series. Along with Miguel Ramos Mikkel will be driving the Ferrari 488 in the GT-Pro class.

Danish Superturisme Turbo 
For the 2017 season of DST Mikkel will be joining Team Roskilde Racing Center where Mikkel will be driving together with Henrik Jansen and Peter Christensen.

European Le Mans series
Winner in LMGTE class of the 2015 European Le Mans series or ELMS, Racing Ferrari 458 GT2 in the GTE Class.

European Le Mans series
2nd place in debut season 2014 European Le Mans series or ELMS, Racing Ferrari 458 GT3 in the GTC Class.

Maserati Trofeo World series
In 2013 he began competing in the Maserati Trofeo World series, and finished the season winning 2 titles (Drivers Championship) (under age 30 Championship).

DTC
In 2012 he began competing in the Danish Thundersport Championship, and finished the season in a solid 5th place.

Formula Two
In 2011 he began competing in the FIA Formula Two Championship, and finished the season in a solid 11th place.

Racing record

Career summary

Complete FIA Formula Two Championship results
(key) (Races in bold indicate pole position) (Races in italics indicate fastest lap)

24 Hours of Le Mans results

References

External links 
 
 Mikkel Mac career details at driverdb.com

1992 births
Living people
Danish racing drivers
Formula BMW Europe drivers
Formula Renault 2.0 NEC drivers
FIA Formula Two Championship drivers
24 Hours of Le Mans drivers
European Le Mans Series drivers
International GT Open drivers
People from Guldborgsund Municipality
Sportspeople from Region Zealand
Motaworld Racing drivers
Emil Frey Racing drivers
KTR drivers
AF Corse drivers
24H Series drivers
Le Mans Cup drivers